C. W. & George L. Rapp, commonly known as Rapp & Rapp, was an American architectural firm famed for the design of movie palaces and other theatres. Active from 1906 to 1965 and based in Chicago, the office designed over 400 theatres, including the Chicago Theatre (1921), Bismarck Hotel and Theatre (1926) and Oriental Theater (1926) in Chicago, the Five Flags Center (1910) in Dubuque, Iowa and the Paramount Theatres in New York City (1926) and Aurora, Illinois (1931).

The named partners were brothers C. Ward Rapp (1860–1926) and George L. Rapp (1878–1941), sons of a builder and natives of Carbondale, Illinois. Their Chicago practice is not to be confused with the Trinidad, Colorado practice of their brothers Isaac H. Rapp (1854–1933) and William M. Rapp (1863–1920) or the notable Cincinnati architects George W. Rapp and Walter L. Rapp, to whom they were not related.

Biographies and history
Cornelius Ward Rapp was born December 26, 1860. In the 1880s he moved to Chicago, where he worked for architect Cyrus P. Thomas. In 1889, the two formed the partnership of Thomas & Rapp. This was dissolved in 1895, when both opened independent offices. Rapp's major projects over the next eleven years included Altgeld Hall (1895–96) and Wheeler Hall (1903–04) at what is now Southern Illinois University Carbondale and the Coles County Courthouse (1898–99) in Charleston. His father was superintendent of construction for both Carbondale buildings. Rapp was an independent practitioner until 1906, when he formed a partnership with his younger brother, George L. Rapp.

George Leslie Rapp was born February 16, 1878. He was educated in the School of Architecture of the University of Illinois, graduating in 1899. He then followed his brother to Chicago, where he joined the office of architect Edmund R. Krause. Of the projects completed by Krause during Rapp's employment, the best known was the Majestic Theatre, now the CIBC Theatre. After seven years with Krause he joined his brother to form the firm of C. W. & George L. Rapp, commonly known as Rapp & Rapp. Following early success with the Five Flags Center in Dubuque, Iowa, the new firm quickly specialized in theatres. In 1917 they began working with the Balaban & Katz chain of movie theatres, a relationship leading to the construction of many early movie palaces. In 1926 Paramount Pictures bought a controlling interest in Balaban & Katz, after which the Rapp office gained a national practice. C. Ward Rapp died the same year, leaving his brother to head the firm. The firm diversified its practice away from theatres during the 1930s, and designed a variety of commercial and industrial projects. During this period Rapp was joined by Mason Gerardi Rapp, son of his elder brother William M. Rapp. After George L. Rapp's retirement in 1938, Mason G. Rapp succeeded to the practice. After the death of his uncle in 1941 he renamed the firm Rapp & Rapp, which had always been its common name. In 1965 Rapp retired, and the firm was dissolved. Mason G. Rapp died in 1978.

Legacy
The Rapp brothers were among a group of highly influential American theatre architects, which also included Thomas W. Lamb of New York City and John Eberson of Chicago. They were responsible for the design of some 400 theatres, most of which were built in the 1920s. They designed many movie palaces, including a number of atmospheric theatres, which utilized romantic architectural elements to evoke specific times and places. Their only surviving atmospheric theatre in Chicago is the Gateway Theatre, now the Copernicus Center, completed in 1930. If murals were to be included in the theatres, Louis Grell of Chicago was commissioned to paint them.

Many of the theatres and other buildings designed by the Rapp brothers have been listed on the United States National Register of Historic Places.

Buildings
Some of the notable buildings that the firm designed include:

Chicago, Illinois
 Central Park Theatre
 Chicago Theatre
 Gateway Theatre, now Copernicus Center
 Hotel Windermere
 Jackson Shore Apartments
 New Bismarck Hotel, today "Hotel Allegro"
 Old Dearborn Bank Building, also known as 203 North Wabash Street
 Oriental Theatre, now James M. Nederlander Theatre
 Palace Theatre
 Riviera Theatre
 Tivoli Theatre
 Uptown Theatre

Other areas
Denver, Colorado
Paramount Theatre
Aurora, Illinois
Paramount Theatre
Champaign, Illinois
Orpheum Theater
Joliet, Illinois
Rialto Square Theatre
Streator, Illinois
 The Majestic Theatre
Davenport, Iowa
Capital Theater
Dubuque, Iowa
Five Flags Center
Sioux City, Iowa
Orpheum Theatre
Wichita, Kansas
 Miller Theater (1922-1972)
Ashland, Kentucky
Paramount Arts Center
Detroit, Michigan
Leland Hotel
Michigan Theatre
Kansas City, Missouri
 Mainstreet Theater
St. Louis, Missouri
Ambassador Theatre (demolished)
St. Louis Theater (now Powell Hall)
Jersey City, New Jersey
 Loew's Jersey Theater
Buffalo, New York
 Shea's Theatre
Middletown, New York
Paramount Theatre
New York City
Paramount Theatre, Brooklyn
Paramount Theatre, Times Square
Kings Theatre, Brooklyn (formerly Loew's Kings Theater)
Cincinnati, Ohio
Palace Theatre (demolished)
Cleveland, Ohio
Palace Theatre
Youngstown, Ohio
Warner Theatre (now DeYor Performing Arts Center)
Tulsa, Oklahoma
Akdar Theatre 1922-1964
Portland, Oregon
Paramount Theatre (now Arlene Schnitzer Concert Hall)
Erie, Pennsylvania
Warner Theatre
Pittsburgh, Pennsylvania
Loew's Penn Theatre (now Heinz Hall)
West Chester, Pennsylvania
Warner Theatre
Providence, Rhode Island
 Loew's State Theatre, now the Providence Performing Arts Center
Mitchell, South Dakota
 Corn Palace
Chattanooga, Tennessee
Tivoli Theatre
Memphis, Tennessee
Orpheum Theatre
Charlottesville, Virginia
Paramount Theater
Seattle, Washington
 Paramount Theatre
Baraboo, Wisconsin
Al. Ringling TheaterMadison, Wisconsin
Orpheum Theatre (Madison, Wisconsin)
Milwaukee, Wisconsin
Uptown Theatre (demolished)
 Bradley Symphony Center, formerly the Warner Grand Theater
Kenosha, Wisconsin
 Gateway Theatre, now the Rhode Center for the Arts
Racine, Wisconsin
 RKO Main Street Theatre

References

Further reading
 Charles Ward Rapp, Rapp & Rapp, Architects'' (2014)

External links

 Theatre Historical Society of America
 History of Chicago's Uptown Theatre
 Friends of the Uptown
 Balaban and Katz
 Friends of the Loew's (Jersey Theatre)
 Rialto Square Theater Official Website
 203 North Wabash building website
 
 Hotel Warner website
 Louis Grell Foundation/
 Architectural records for buildings by Rapp & Rapp, (ca. 1911-1971 (bulk 1911-1959)), held by the Chicago History Museum

American theatre architects
Architects from Illinois
Defunct architecture firms based in Chicago